Pál Wágner (born 1 November 1935) is a Hungarian rower. He competed in two events at the 1960 Summer Olympics.

References

1935 births
Living people
Hungarian male rowers
Olympic rowers of Hungary
Rowers at the 1960 Summer Olympics
Rowers from Budapest